The Amarillo version of the NWA Brass Knuckles Championship was a secondary championship that was defended in Dory Funk, Sr.'s Western States Sports promotion based in Amarillo, Texas. Originally created in August 1964, the title was used briefly before being abandoned. It was reactivated three years later and was defended sporadically until the promotion closed in 1981. The championship was used in specialty matches in which the combatants would wear brass knuckles. There were other such championships used in a number of NWA territories throughout the America, with some of the more prominent ones being Fritz Von Erich's World Class Championship Wrestling and Eddie Graham's Championship Wrestling from Florida.

Title history

See also
List of National Wrestling Alliance championships

References

External links

National Wrestling Alliance championships
Regional professional wrestling championships
Hardcore wrestling championships
Western States Sports championships